The Bachelor is a Greek reality television series, based on the American version of the same name. The show began airing on September 10, 2020 on Alpha TV. George Satsidis is the host of the show.

The second season has been announced and began airing on September 7, 2021.

Plot
The program has a format similar to the American version, with 20 women competing for a single man to be selected as his romantic partner. Through the series, he learns more about each contestant. At the end of each episode, the candidates will be awarded a rose by the bachelor, symbolizing their continued stay in the contest. On the other hand, candidates who do not receive a rose are eliminated and leave the program.

Seasons

Ratings

References

External links
 Official website

Alpha TV original programming
Greek reality television series
2020 Greek television series debuts
2020s Greek television series
2020 Greek television seasons
Greek-language television shows
Greek TV series
Greek television series based on American television series